Nyctemera is a genus of tiger moths in the family Erebidae first described by Jacob Hübner in 1820. The genus includes the species Nyctemera annulata and Nyctemera amica, which are closely related and are able to interbreed.

Description
The wings are usually dark with lighter patches, while the body is often aposematically coloured to discourage birds and other visual predators from eating them.

Palpi porrectly upturned. Antennae bipectinate in both sexes, where branches short in females. Forewing with vein 3 from before the angle of cell, vein 5 from above it and vein 6 from upper angle. Vein 7 and 10 from short areole which is formed by the anastomosis of veins 8 and 9. Hindwings with vein 3 from before end of cell and vein 5 from angle or from above it. Veins 6 and 7 stalked or from upper angle. Vein 8 from before middle of all.

Ecology
The slow-flying moths can often be seen feeding at flowers; it is common around its preferred food plants of the daisy family, for example groundsel (and other Senecio spp.), ragworts and Cineraria. The colourful hairy larvae feed openly on the plants, often stripping off all the leaves. The mature larvae will sometimes wander from the plant to pupate. The loosely spun cocoon incorporates some of the larval hairs and may also be found amongst leaves.

Taxonomy
Several species formerly placed here are now assigned to other genera. These include Utetheisa (containing Atasca, Pitasila and Raanya, erstwhile subgenera of Nyctemera), the revalidated Chiromachla, Podomachla and Xylecata, and the newly established Afronyctemera.

Species

Subgenus Arctata Roepke, 1949 

Nyctemera angustipenis
Nyctemera arctata
Nyctemera montata
Nyctemera browni
Nyctemera consobriniformis
Nyctemera gratia
Nyctemera hyalina
Nyctemera kinabaluensis
Nyctemera kishidai
Nyctemera lunulata
Nyctemera luzonensis
Nyctemera owadai
Nyctemera palawanica
Nyctemera robusta
Nyctemera toxopei
Nyctemera undulata

Subgenus Coleta Roepke, 1949 

Nyctemera coleta
Nyctemera groenendaeli

Subgenus Deilemera Hübner, [1820], 1816 

Nyctemera carissima
Nyctemera evergista
Nyctemera gerra
Nyctemera luzonica
Nyctemera maculata
Nyctemera muelleri
Nyctemera swinhoei

Subgenus Luctuosana de Vos, 2010 

Nyctemera contrasta
Nyctemera dentifascia
Nyctemera herklotsii
Nyctemera luctuosa
Nyctemera ludekingii
Nyctemera simulatrix

Subgenus Nyctemera s.str. 

Nyctemera amicus
Nyctemera annulata
Nyctemera baulus
Nyctemera cenis
Nyctemera kala
Nyctemera kebeae
Nyctemera lacticinia
Nyctemera latemarginata
Nyctemera latistriga
Nyctemera mastrigti
Nyctemera obtusa
Nyctemera pagenstecheri
Nyctemera pseudokala
Nyctemera sonticum
Nyctemera warmasina

The Nyctemera (Nyctemera) clathrata species group 

Nyctemera clathratum
Nyctemera dauila
Nyctemera giloloensis
Nyctemera latimargo
Nyctemera leopoldi
Nyctemera mesolychna
Nyctemera oninica

Subgenus Orphanos Hübner, [1825], 1816 

Nyctemera adversata
Nyctemera apensis
Nyctemera calcicola
Nyctemera clarior
Nyctemera distincta
Nyctemera kiauensis
Nyctemera kinibalina
Nyctemera lugens
Nyctemera malaccana
Nyctemera ploesslo
Nyctemera popiya
Nyctemera radiata
Nyctemera regularis
Nyctemera sumatrensis
Nyctemera tenompoka
Nyctemera tripunctaria

Subgenus Tritomera de Vos & Dubatolov, 2010 
Nyctemera trita

Unsorted Nyctemera species 

Nyctemera formosana (mostly placed as a synonym of Nyctemera carissima)
Nyctemera genora
Nyctemera immitans
Nyctemera quaternarium

Afrotropical species transferred into Afronyctemera Dubatolov, 2006 
Nyctemera itokina

Afrotropical species transferred into Chiromachla Strand, 1909 

Nyctemera chalcosidia
Nyctemera gracilis
Nyctemera insulare
Nyctemera leuconoe
Nyctemera pallescens
Nyctemera perspicua
Nyctemera restrictum
Nyctemera seychellensis
Nyctemera torbeni
Nyctemera transitella

Afrotropical species transferred into Podomachla Strand, 1909 

Nyctemera acraeina
Nyctemera antinorii
Nyctemera apicalis
Nyctemera arieticornis
Nyctemera chromis
Nyctemera insularis
Nyctemera usambarae
Nyctemera virgo

Afrotropical species transferred into Xylecata Swinhoe, 1904 

Nyctemera biformis
Nyctemera crassiantennata
Nyctemera druna
Nyctemera glauce
Nyctemera hemixantha
Nyctemera rattrayi
Nyctemera ugandicola
Nyctemera uniformis
Nyctemera xanthura

Main articles on Nyctemera taxonomy 
  1994 [1995]: Nyctemera groenendaeli spec. nov. from New Guinea (Lepidoptera: Arctiidae, Nyctemerina). Nachrichten des Entomologischen Vereins Apollo, N.F. 15 (4): 481–489.
  1995: A revision of Nyctemera consobrina (Hopffer, 1874) with redescription of three subspecies (Lepidoptera: Arctiidae, Nyctemerinae). Nachrichten des Entomologischen Vereins Apollo, N.F. 16 (1): 81–93.
  1996: Nyctemera pseudokala sp. nov. and N. mastrigti sp. nov., two new species from Indonesia (Lepidoptera: Arctiidae, Nyctemerinae). Nachrichten des Entomologischen Vereins Apollo, N.F. 17 (3): 301–311.
  1997: A revision of Nyctemera kebeae (Bethune-Baker, 1904) (with descriptions of two new subspecies) and N. warmasina (Bethune-Baker, 1910) (Lepidoptera: Arctiidae, Nyctemerinae). Nachrichten des Entomologischen Vereins Apollo, N.F. 18 (1): 1-12.
  1997: The identity of Nyctemera simulatrix Walker, 1864 (Lepidoptera: Arctiidae, Nyctemerinae). Nachrichten des Entomologischen Vereins Apollo, N.F. 18 (2-3): 205–210.
  2002: Revision of the Nyctemera evergista group (=subgenus Deilemera Hübner) (Lepidoptera: Arctiidae, Arctiinae, Nyctemerini). Nachrichten des Entomologischen Vereins Apollo, N.F. 23 (1/2): 7-32.
  2007: Revision of the Nyctemera clathratum complex (Lepidoptera: Arctiidae). Tijdschrift voor Entomologie 150: 39–54.
  2007: The Utetheisa species of the subgenera Pitasila, Atasca and Raanya subgen. n. (Insecta, Lepidoptera: Arctiidae). Aldrovandia 3: 31-120.
 
  2010: Nyctemerini. In: , Tiger-moths of Eurasia (Lepidoptera, Arctiidae). Neue Entomologische Nachrichten 65: 11–18.
  2006: On the generic status of the Afrotropical Nyctemera species (Lepidoptera, Arctiidae). Atalanta 37 (1/2): 191–205.

References

External links

 
 

Nyctemerina
Moth genera